Thomas Bloomer Balch was a Presbyterian pastor during the American Civil War. Thomas was born to Stephen Bloomer Balch and Elizabeth [Beall] Balch on February 28, 1793, at Georgetown, District of Columbia, US.  Thomas was a graduate of the College of New Jersey in 1813 and Princeton Theological Seminary in 1817, where he was a member of the American Whig Society.  Hampden-Sydney College conferred an honorary DD on him in 1860.  Daniel Webster is supposed to have described him as the most learned man he had ever known.

Baltimore Presbytery ordained Thomas on October 31, 1816.  For several years he assisted his father in the church at Georgetown, Virginia.  He accepted a call to Snow Hill, Rehoboth and Pitts Creek, Maryland July 19, 1820.  Snow Hill is the oldest Presbyterian Church in America.

Thomas Balch was listed as a missionary in Fairfax County, Virginia, from 1829 to 1836.  His brother-in-law, Septimus Tuston, had been a regular preacher at Greenwich, Virginia, between 1825 and 1842.  This connection may have led to Thomas becoming the stated supply at Warrenton and Greenwich, Virginia 1836–38 and again 1874–78.  He also supplied in Prince William and Nokesville.

Just after he accepted the call to the churches in Maryland, Thomas Balch married Susan Carter of Fairfax, Va. (8/21/22)  Susan was the daughter of Charles Beal Carter of Shirley.  Charles Beale Carter was an uncle of General Robert E. Lee.  No doubt the marriage into the prominent and wealthy family helped Thomas financially.

When Thomas and Susan moved to Prince William and Fauquier Counties, they bought a place between Auburn and Greenwich. He called the property Ringwood. He along with Jane Alexander Milligan ran a boarding school for girls there. Part of the structure was later remodeled.

Thomas and his wife were direct observers of the American Civil War and interacted with both Confederate and Federal troops.  Thomas wrote of their personal experiences in My Manse During the War.

He died February 14, 1878, at his home, Ringwood. His wife, Susan, had expired the year before. His friend William Wilson Corcoran provided stones for the couple and they are buried in the Greenwich Presbyterian Cemetery in Greenwich, Virginia. During his lifetime Thomas Balch had ‘become almost as highly regarded by Virginia Presbyterians as his famous father had been by the citizens of Georgetown and Washington.'

Dr. Thomas B. Balch frequently wrote for the Southern Literary Messenger, The Christian World, and published in Christianity and Literature.

Writings 
 My Manse During the War provided by the University of Carolina, Chapel Hill. (My Manse During the War).
 The Ringwood Discourses - Various Sermons  via Google Books
 Ringwood Manse - Collection of related poems by Balch, collected by a suitor to his daughter, Julia, via archive.org

External links 
 Balch Genealogy, p.18 - Julia Ringwood 
 GreenwichPresbyterianChurch notes on Thomas Bloomer Balch (pdf) 
 Reference - Brooke Family of Whitechurch - 1899, Thomas Willing Balch
 Fauquier Country land transfers,  THARPE to BALCH Deed, 8 Mar 1866; rec. 13 Apr 1866

American Presbyterian ministers
1793 births
Princeton Theological Seminary alumni
Virginia Whigs
19th-century American politicians
American Presbyterian missionaries
1878 deaths
People from Washington, D.C.
Union Army chaplains
Confederate States Army chaplains
Presbyterian missionaries in the United States
19th-century American clergy
Beall family of Maryland